Allari Priyudu is a 1993 Indian Telugu-language musical romantic comedy film directed by K. Raghavendra Rao. The film stars Rajasekhar, Ramya Krishna and Madhu Bala. The film was premiered at the 1994 International Film Festival of India in the mainstream section. The film is adaptation of Hindi film Saajan.The film was dubbed into Tamil as Yaarukku Mappillai Yaaro. It was remade in Kannada as Chora Chittha Chora, with V. Ravichandran, Namrata Shirodkar and Malavika. The film was recorded as a Blockbuster at the box office. The film won two Filmfare Awards & two Nandi Awards.

Plot

Kavita and Lalita are dearest friends. They've been living together ever since Lalita's father died while trying to save Kavita from being crushed by a machine on a construction site. Lalita has been secretly writing poems to thrill her family and especially Kavita. Meanwhile, Raja is a lower-class musician who stays in a rental house along with his friends with a band owned by Babu Mohan. He lies to his grandmother saying he has a big job, but he believes that one day his band will become popular. He one day comes across one of Lalita's poems and falls in love with her. He writes a letter to Lalita stating how beautiful her poem was, she too falls for him after reading it. They both write letters to each other expressing their loving feelings. However, Raja and Lalita get into a series of clashes without knowing they are the lovers who are writing the letters to each other. Lalita soon finds out that her lover is Raja, but when she is about to propose to him, she finds out that Kavita had fallen in love with him. Not wanting to ruin her relationship with Kavita, she tells Kavita to act like the lady who writes letters to Raja. Raja mistakes Kavita to be the one writing the poems as they both fall in love. The rest of the story deals with whether Raja ever finds out that Lalita was the one writing the poems and letters to him. What will be Kavita's reaction when she finds the truth? This question forms the climax.

Cast

Music

The music  of the film was composed by M. M. Keeravani.

Awards
Filmfare Awards
Best Director - K. Raghavendra Rao
Best Music Director - M. M. Keeravani

Nandi Awards
Best Director - K. Raghavendra Rao
Best Music Director -M. M. Keeravani

References

External links
 

1993 films
1990s Telugu-language films
Indian romantic comedy films
Indian romantic musical films
1993 romantic comedy films
Films directed by K. Raghavendra Rao
Films scored by M. M. Keeravani
Telugu films remade in other languages